Little Girl Blue is a 2007 Czech drama film written and directed by Alice Nellis. The film was awarded "Best Film" at the Czech Lion awards for 2007.

Cast
Iva Bittová as Julie
Karel Roden as Richard
Martha Issová as Cecílie
Miloslav König as Piano shopkeeper
Ivan Franek as Karele
Natálie Drabiscáková as Ardana
Kamila Vondrová as Denisa
Igor Chmela as Young Man
Miroslav Krobot as Gynaecologist
Sabina Remundová as Young Woman
Anna Šišková as Real estate agent
Doubravka Svobodová

References

External links

2007 drama films
2007 films
Czech Lion Awards winners (films)
Golden Kingfisher winners
Czech drama films
2000s Czech films